Bengt Lidforss (15 September 186823 September 1913) was a prominent Swedish socialist, antisemite, and an accomplished natural scientist and writer.

Biography 
Lidforss was born in Lund, Sweden, and died there. He studied botany and biology at Lund University and received his B.A. at nineteen. Later he received a PhD from Lund University. He became a Professor of Botany at Uppsala University in 1909 and at Lund University in 1910. He was one of the first Swedish scientists to write popular science. Lidforss developed a strong stance against religion and the Church of Sweden. He published articles in Malmö-based social democrat newspaper Arbetet.

Lidforss was a friend of August Strindberg and was an important name in the early Swedish socialist movement. He was one of the first intellectuals in Sweden to become a socialist; he was also a pessimist on capitalism. He was known to be bisexual. He was a strident antisemite.

Botany

References 

. Bengt Lidforss. En levnadsteckning. Stockholm: 1968.

Swedish male writers
Swedish socialists
Swedish anti-capitalists
Swedish botanists
Swedish biologists
People from Lund
Swedish scientists
Swedish LGBT scientists
Swedish LGBT writers
1913 deaths
1868 births
Bisexual men
Bisexual scientists